GLZ may refer to:

 Gilze-Rijen Air Base, in the Netherlands
 Glazebrook railway station, in England
 Army Radio, Israeli Army Radio, known as GLZ (גלצ)
 Galgalatz, an Israeli radio station operated by Army Radio